The An Innocent Man Tour was a 1984 concert tour by singer-songwriter Billy Joel.  The tour began on January 18 in Providence, Rhode Island (which went on despite a snow storm) and ended on July 5 with the last of seven shows at Madison Square Garden in New York City.

The tour was Joel's first large world tour since a 1982 motorcycle accident.  The tour was very popular, with a contemporaneous report stating that finding tickets except through scalpers was "virtually impossible."  A report on the February 1, 1984 Toledo show stated that his band included Frank Simms, Peter Huwlett and Bob Duncan on backing vocals, a three-piece brass section of Larry Etkin, Bob Livingood on trumpets, Glenn Stulpin on saxophones as well as Joel's touring/recording band of Liberty DeVitto (drums, percussion), Doug Stegmeyer (bass), Russell Javors (rhythm guitar), David LeBolt (keyboards), David Brown (lead guitar), and Mark Rivera (saxophones, percussion).

Tour dates

Setlist
This setlist is from the June 6th-9th Broadcast at Wembley Stadium. It does not represent all the dates throughout the tour.

 "The Mexican Connection"
 "Prelude/Angry Young Man"
 "My Life"
 "Piano Man"
 "Don't Ask Me Why"
 "Allentown"
 "Goodnight Saigon"
 "Pressure" 
 "Leave a Tender Moment Alone" (with Toots Thielemans)
"An Innocent Man"
 "What’s Your Name?" (unreleased song)
 "The Longest Time" 
 "This Night"
"Just The Way You Are"
"Scenes from an Italian Restaurant"
"Sometimes a Fantasy"
 "It's Still Rock and Roll to Me"
 "Uptown Girl"
 "Big Shot"
 "Tell Her About It"
"You May Be Right"
Only the Good Die Young"

References

External links 
 1984 Concerts on BillyJoelFan.com

1984 concert tours
Billy Joel concert tours